The Averitt House is a historic house in the rural central part of Miller County, Arkansas. It was built in 1931-33 by Tom Averitt, the local health inspector at the time, and is a locally unique example of rustic log architecture. It is roughly L-shaped, with a shed-roof porch on its northeastern facade. A single fieldstone chimney rises through the roof near the junction of the L.  The walls are made of unfinished logs joined by saddle notches. The logs for its construction were supposedly taken by clearing the site on which it stands. Not far from the house stands a garage, also built by Averitt from logs.

The house was listed on the National Register of Historic Places in 1992.

See also
National Register of Historic Places listings in Miller County, Arkansas

References

Houses on the National Register of Historic Places in Arkansas
Houses completed in 1933
Houses in Miller County, Arkansas
National Register of Historic Places in Miller County, Arkansas